Jörg Pfeifer (born 19 March 1952) is a retired East German athlete who competed mainly in the 100 metres.

He competed for East Germany in the 1976 Summer Olympics held in Montreal, Quebec,  Canada in the 4 × 100 metre relay where he won the silver medal with his teammates Manfred Kokot, Klaus-Dieter Kurrat and Alexander Thieme.

References

European Championships

1952 births
Living people
East German male sprinters
Olympic silver medalists for East Germany
Athletes (track and field) at the 1976 Summer Olympics
Olympic athletes of East Germany
Place of birth missing (living people)
European Athletics Championships medalists
Medalists at the 1976 Summer Olympics
Olympic silver medalists in athletics (track and field)